Young Civic Democrats (MOD) is a political platform within the Civic Democratic Party. It consists of young people. It is considered a competitor to the Young Conservatives. It had 2,000 members in January 2018 making it the largest youth wing in the Czech Republic. Its members are also members of the Civic Democratic Party.

History
The platform was founded on 9 December 2016. The platform became a competition to the Young Conservatives (MK). Members of MOD started to compete with MK and defined against it. MOD participated on campaign for the 2017 legislative election. The platform aimed to support individual candidates of ODS and was very active on social media.

Young Civic Democrats supported Jiří Drahoš during 2018 presidential election.

References

External links
Official Website

Civic Democratic Party (Czech Republic)
2016 establishments in the Czech Republic
Political parties established in 2016
Youth wings of political parties in the Czech Republic
Youth wings of Alliance of Conservatives and Reformists in Europe member parties
Youth wings of conservative parties